René de Labarrière (28 January 1899 – 6 July 1948) was a French army officer, considered to be the first United Nations soldier killed in action. He died in Palestine after driving over a land mine.

On 6 October 1998 he was honoured by Kofi Annan in the UN's headquarters in New York City, posthumously receiving the second Dag Hammarskjöld medal.

References 

French officials of the United Nations
1899 births
1948 deaths
People from Carcassonne
French military personnel killed in action
Deaths by explosive device